Rottum is a nature reserve in the Wadden Sea in the Netherlands. It consists of the three West Frisian Islands Rottumerplaat, Rottumeroog, and Zuiderduintjes. As a nature reserve, Rottum receives highest protection status under Dutch law; admission to the islands is restricted. The Dutch Ministry of Agriculture, Nature and Food Quality and the government organisations Rijkswaterstaat and Staatsbosbeheer share responsibility for the nature reserve.

References

Het Hogeland
Landforms of Groningen (province)
Islands of Groningen (province)
Nature reserves in the Netherlands
Uninhabited islands of the Netherlands
West Frisian Islands